A Change of Seasons is an EP by progressive metal band Dream Theater, first released on September 19, 1995, through East West Records. It comprises the 23-minute title track and a collection of live cover songs performed at a fan club concert on January 31, 1995 at Ronnie Scott's Jazz Club in London, England.

The title track was recorded at BearTracks Studios in New York and was originally slated to be released on the 1992 album Images and Words, but was instead re-recorded and released as an EP.  Although the song includes audio samples from the 1989 film Dead Poets Society (as well as quotes from the 1648 Robert Herrick poem, To the Virgins, to Make Much of Time), the lyrics, written by drummer Mike Portnoy, were not inspired by the film.  Instead, "it's about the cycle of life. Basically, I took a lot of personal incidents, like losing my mother and a couple of things that happened in my life, and I wrote them into the lyrics." The back cover has a calendar displaying the date November 16, the date Portnoy's mother died. A Change of Seasons was also the first Dream Theater release featuring Derek Sherinian on keyboards.

Excerpts from the title track were used by NBC in a segment on downhill skiing during the 2002 Winter Olympics.

Although the record is labeled as an EP, its running time of 57:30 makes it significantly longer than a standard EP, and even many LPs, including Dream Theater's first two albums. According to Portnoy, "It was important for us and the label for it not to be perceived as the latest studio record. That's why we tagged it an EP."

Track listing

Credits

Dream Theater 
James LaBrie – vocals
John Myung – bass
John Petrucci – guitar
Mike Portnoy – drums
Derek Sherinian – keyboards

Production 
David Prater – producer, mixing
Doug Oberkircher – engineer (track 1), mixing
Andy Scarth – engineer (tracks 2-5)
Robert Siciliano – assistant engineer
Ted Jensen – mastering at Sterling Sound, NYC
Mike Portnoy – cover concept
Larry Freemantle – art direction
Joseph Cultice – photography

Chart performance

References 

Dream Theater albums
1995 debut EPs
Albums with cover art by Storm Thorgerson
Albums recorded at Ronnie Scott's Jazz Club